State Route 126 (SR 126) is a state highway in the U.S. state of California that serves Ventura and Los Angeles counties. The route runs from U.S. Route 101 in Ventura to Interstate 5 in Santa Clarita through the Santa Clara River Valley. The highway is an important connector highway in Ventura County, and serves as an alternate route into the Santa Clarita Valley, and (via Interstate 5) the San Fernando Valley area of Los Angeles and the High Desert of Antelope Valley.

Route description

SR 126 generally follows the Santa Clara River through the valley, passing through the towns of Fillmore and Santa Paula. The freeway portion of the highway, known as the Santa Paula Freeway, begins in Ventura at U.S. Route 101. It proceeds northeast through the city, interchanging with the western end of SR 118 at a grade-separated interchange. SR 126 then passes through areas of agriculture, orchards, and the Saticoy Oil Field to its northeast, continuing through Santa Paula, where it intersects SR 150, and the freeway portion terminates at Hallock Drive. SR 126 continues as a highway thereafter, known as Telegraph Road. This section extends through Fillmore as Ventura Street, where SR 126 meets SR 23. Following this, SR 126 as Telegraph Road encounters the community of Buckhorn, as well as the edge of Piru and the important historical Rancho Camulos.

The stretch of SR 126 between Santa Paula and the Los Angeles County line has seen an unusually high amount of traffic fatalities and other injurious accidents. Head-on collisions were very frequent on the older, curvy, two-laned sections, earning this portion of the road its nickname, "Blood Alley". An article from the Los Angeles Times in 1996, noted 34 fatalities between 1990 and 1994. Though the highway has since been improved in most areas, traffic fatalities are still quite common.

In Los Angeles County, SR 126 is known as Henry Mayo Drive. The highway continues east to an interchange with I-5. At this interchange the SR 126 designation terminates, and the road continues into Santa Clarita as Newhall Ranch Road.

SR 126 is part of the California Freeway and Expressway System, and is part of the National Highway System, a network of highways that are considered essential to the country's economy, defense, and mobility by the Federal Highway Administration. SR 126 is eligible to be included in the State Scenic Highway System, but it is not officially designated as a scenic highway by the California Department of Transportation.

History

Original plans
In 1958, the freeway was originally planned to follow the northern banks of the Santa Clara River, connecting US 101 to US 99 (I-5 today) and US 6 (SR 14 today) through what is now Santa Clarita. In the mid-1960s, construction of the 4-lane freeway began immediately northeast of Oxnard at US 101 and immediately east of Santa Clarita at US 6.

Freeway revolts
In the face of anti-development pressure from Ventura County citizens, and suffering from severe financial problems as a result of the 1971 Sylmar earthquake and the late-1970s California tax revolt, Caltrans abandoned its plans. The freeway, which by then had reached Santa Paula, terminates at a four-way intersection immediately east of the city. From there, a 4-lane undivided highway continues on toward I-5. The eastern approach of SR 126 was abandoned midway through the interchange's construction at SR 14. Two long on-ramps and a large graded plateau are all that remain of the approach.

The only remnants of these plans are the two long ramps to and from SR 14 at the Sierra Highway interchange (exit 6A) in Santa Clarita, and Newhall Ranch Road, a six to eight-lane divided local road that continues from the current terminus of SR 126 at Interstate 5 and roughly follows the original 1958 route to just past Bouquet Canyon Road on the north side of the Santa Clara River. Newhall Ranch Road changes to Golden Valley Road 1.75 miles east of Bouquet Canyon Road, and continues to SR 14, roughly one mile south of the original planned terminus of SR 126.

1984 Summer Olympics
The 1984 Summer Olympics Organizing Committee was allowed to close the freeway portion between Ventura and Santa Paula for cycling practice for the 100 Kilometer Team Trials on two consecutive Thursdays.

Cross Valley Connector
On March 27, 2010, the City of Santa Clarita completed the decade-long Cross Valley Connector (CVC) project, which sought to connect SR 126 directly to SR 14 roughly along the original route alignment. The city-maintained route is named Newhall Ranch Road on the western segment, and Golden Valley Road on the eastern segment. The two segments meet at the intersection of Newhall Ranch Road and Golden Valley Road, where Golden Valley Road turns and continues northeast.

Commerce Center Drive
In 2017, Caltrans began construction along the 1.75-mile eastern end of SR 126, upgrading the 6-lane divided highway to an 8-lane freeway. A new interchange replaced the traffic signal at Commerce Center Drive.

Major intersections

See also

References

External links

California @ AARoads - State Route 126
Caltrans: Route 126 highway conditions
California Highways: SR 126

Cancelled highway projects in the United States
126
State Route 126
State Route 126
Fillmore, California
Santa Clara River (California)
Santa Clarita, California
Santa Paula, California
Ventura, California
126